Conus jorioi is a species of sea snail, a marine gastropod mollusk in the family Conidae, the cone snails, cone shells or cones.

Description
Predatory and venomous, these snails are capable of stinging humans. Their shell size attains 53 mm.

Distribution
This marine species of cone snail is found in the Atlantic Ocean off Northeastern Brazil.

References

External links 
 To World Register of Marine Species
 

jorioi
Gastropods described in 2013